Macheren is a commune in the Moselle department in the Grand Est region of north-eastern France.

The village is situated on the N56 road.

Population

See also
 Communes of the Moselle department

References

External links
 

Communes of Moselle (department)